Eigirdas Žukauskas (born 3 June 1992) is a Lithuanian professional basketball player for BC Wolves of the Lithuanian Basketball League. Žukauskas plays both the Power forward and small forward positions.

Professional career
A native of Radviliškis, he has competed with various teams in Lithuania and France. 

On 7 March 2022 he signed with Tofaş of the Turkish BSL.

On 22 July 2022 he signed with BC Wolves of the Lithuanian Basketball League.

References 

1992 births
Living people
BC Dzūkija players
BC Prienai players
BC Šiauliai players
BC Statyba players
BC Wolves players
JSA Bordeaux Basket players
Lithuanian men's basketball players
Parma Basket players
People from Radviliškis
Saint-Chamond Basket players
Shooting guards
Small forwards
Tofaş S.K. players